The Song of Bernadette (German: Das Lied von Bernadette) is a 1941 novel that tells the story of Saint Bernadette Soubirous, who, from February to July 1858 reported eighteen visions of the Blessed Virgin Mary in Lourdes, France. The novel was written by Franz Werfel and translated into English by Lewis Lewisohn in 1942. It was extremely popular, spending more than a year on the New York Times Best Seller list and 13 weeks in first place.

The novel was adapted into the 1943 film The Song of Bernadette, starring Jennifer Jones.

Origins
Franz Werfel was a German-speaking Jew born in Prague in 1890. He became well known as a playwright.  In the 1930s in Vienna, he began writing popular satirical plays lampooning the Nazi regime until the Anschluss, when the Third Reich under Adolf Hitler annexed Austria in 1938. Werfel and his wife Alma (Gustav Mahler's widow) fled to Paris until the Germans invaded France in 1940.

In his Personal Preface to The Song of Bernadette, Franz Werfel takes up the story:

Hunted by the Gestapo, the Werfels experienced anxiety for their hosts as well as themselves. A number of families took turns in giving them shelter. These people told the Werfels the story of Bernadette. Werfel vowed that, if he and his wife escaped, he would put off all tasks and write Bernadette's story into a novel.

Plot
The story is about the Platonic love relationship between Bernadette and “the lady” of her vision. Bernadette’s love for the lady attains “ecstasy” when in her presence at a grotto near Lourdes. The love she feels sustains her throughout the trials and tribulations which she is made to endure by doubters and by public officials who see her as a threat to the established order, which is based on a secular milieu.

The lady guides Bernadette to the discovery of a stream which springs from beneath the ground of the grotto. The curative powers of the water are discovered by various town folk, and the word is spread by them. Bernadette does no proselytizing. 

The lady informs Bernadette of her wishes to have a chapel build on the site of the grotto, and to have processions to the site. Bernadette informs church and secular officials about this, but takes no action to have it done. Eventually, it gets done. Bernadette does not actively cultivate a following, but people are attracted to her by the love she radiates and by witnessing the ecstatic trance she experiences when she has visions of the lady at the grotto. 

Bernadette does no preaching or evangelizing, but her behavior of itself converts doubters, and the very church officials who once doubted her become her protectors and advocates. Although she is dying of tuberculosis, she refuses to seek a cure from the lady, or to drink the curative water. She is canonized several years after her death.

The story of Bernadette Soubirous and Our Lady of Lourdes is told by Werfel with many embellishments, such as the chapter in which Bernadette is invited to board at the home of a rich woman who thinks Bernadette's visionary "lady" might be her deceased daughter. In side-stories and back story, the history of the town of Lourdes, the contemporary political situation in France, and the responses of believers and detractors are delineated. Werfel describes Bernadette as a religious peasant girl who would have preferred to continue on with an ordinary life, but takes the veil as a nun after she is told that because "Heaven chose her", she must choose Heaven. Bernadette's service as a sacristan, artist-embroiderer, and nurse in the convent are depicted, along with her spiritual growth. After her death, her body as well as her life are scrutinized for indications that she is a saint, and at last she is canonized.

The novel is laid out in five sections of ten chapters each, in a deliberate nod to the Catholic Rosary.

Unusual for a novel, the entire first part, which describes the events on the day that Bernadette first saw the Virgin Mary, is told in the present tense, as if it were happening at the moment. The rest of the novel is in the past tense.

Major themes
Werfel presents Bernadette as a simple and pious girl from a poor family, who is regarded as stupid by her teachers, classmates, and authorities. He also depicts her as having inner strength and personal integrity, which is unshaken by those who challenge her stories of the "Lady of Massabielle" whom she alone can see. Bernadette is not a crusader, but the local people take up the cause of turning the grotto into a spiritual site, although the local authorities resist at first. This drama is played out against the larger canvas of French politics and the contemporary social climate. Explanatory digressions illustrate what Werfel perceives as an ongoing conflict between a human need to believe in the supernatural or in anomalous phenomena; a true religion, which should not address such "popular" manifestations; and the ideas of the Enlightenment and of atheism.

References to history, geography and current science
Apparently, Werfel obtained accounts of Bernadette from Lourdes families whose older members had known her. It is possible that a great deal of folklore and legend had been added to the plain facts by the time Werfel heard the tale.

Lourdes pilgrims often want to know more about Bernadette and do not realize that, far from being a simple-minded shepherdess, she was a self-possessed young woman who stood by her story in the face of tough church and government inquiry. Werfel was able to work this aspect of her personality into his narration.

However, Werfel was not above fictionalization to fill in details or romanticize her story. He embellished the anti-religious feeling of the prosecutor, Vital Dutour (who, according to one source, altered Bernadette's answers to his questions to make her sound  visionary), and transformed the relationship between Bernadette and Antoine Nicolau from one of friendship to one of unrequited love on Nicolau's part; when she leaves Lourdes to become a nun, he vows never to wed.

Werfel's work also features a highly dramatic and fictionalized death scene. In the book, Bernadette cries out in a loud, strong voice, "J'aime (I love)" followed by a whispered "Now and in the hour..." before her voice fails; the point of view characters are a) Sister Marie Thérèse Vauzous, Bernadette's former elementary school teacher, who, by the power of Bernadette's cry of love and transfigured expression, is converted from skepticism to belief that Bernadette's Lady is present in the room and b) Father Marie Dominique Peyramale, who is revitalized physically and spiritually by Bernadette's death. 

In real life, however, Bernadette was in torment during the last day of her life, asking the other nuns to pray for her soul, and her last words—said twice—were "Holy Mary, Mother of God, pray for me, a poor sinner." Following this, according to Sister Nathalie Portat, she made the sign of the cross, drank a few drops of water and died.

Also, while a nun, Marie Thérèse Vauzous, was in charge of the novices at the monastery of Nevers where Bernadette was cloistered, she was neither the daughter of a general nor Bernadette's former schoolteacher. Bernadette first met her at Nevers. And the historic Dean Marie Dominique Peyramale had been dead for about a year and a half by the time that Bernadette herself died on 16 April 1879.

However, in the preface, Werfel states that readers will justifiably ask "What is true and what is invented?" Werfel answers: "All the memorable happenings that constitute the substance of this book took place in the world of reality. Since their beginning dates back no longer than eighty years [N.B. at the time Werfel wrote the book], there beats upon them the bright light of modern history and their truth has been confirmed by friend and foe and by cool observers through faithful testimonies. My story makes no changes in this body of truth. I exercised my right of creative freedom only where the work, as a work of art, demanded certain chronological condensations or where there was need of striking the spark of life from the hardened substance."  He declares: "The Song of Bernadette is a novel but not a fictive work."

It seems to have been inspired in part by Émile Zola's Lourdes (1884), a blistering denunciation of the industry that sprang up in Lourdes around the allegedly miraculous spring. One of Werfel's characters, Hyacinthe de Lafite, a member of the freethinkers' club that hangs around the town cafe, is not only fictional but a thinly disguised portrayal of Zola himself, re-imagined as a failed journalist/author who smugly casts Bernadette's experience in terms of the pagan history of the area: "The shepherd girl out of the antique world who, in the year 1858, sees the guardian nymph of the spring and redeems her from two thousand years of boredom[.]" By the end of the book, Lafite, the lady's "proudest foe", believing himself to be dying of cancer, is "lying on his knees" before the image of Bernadette's lady in the grotto, and crying out, "Bernadette Soubirous, pray for me!" 

Werfel goes into great detail about the cures at the Lourdes Spring, and has Dr. Dozous, the town physician, show Hyacinthe through the wards of the hospital, particularly a dormitory of women with a particularly virulent form of Lupus vulgaris in which the face rots and falls off. Werfel provides medical details and claims that some such women have been completely cured after washing in water from the spring, and reports that many more healings take place during the Blessing of the Eucharist ceremony which is held daily at the grotto. 

Werfel's description of the veiled lupus sufferers is very similar to that of Zola's description of Elise Rouquet, whose nose and mouth are being eaten away by lupus, on pages 13-14 of Lourdes. Rouquet is also the Zola character who bathes her face in water from the Lourdes spring; one sore on her face improves, but the doctors are unable to decide, throughout the book, whether she actually had lupus or some other illness that responds well to washing or if the partial cure is psychosomatic. No such indecision plagues Dr. Dozous or his fellow physicians; in Chapter 46 of The Song of Bernadette, "The Hell of the Flesh," he implausibly informs the fictional Lafite that one of the lupus patients bathed her face in water from the spring and that she "didn't realize at first that she had a nose and mouth again."

Copyright
The Song of Bernadette has been in the public domain in the European Union since 1 January 2016.

Adaptations
A 1943 film version, produced by 20th-Century Fox and directed by Henry King, was a major success and won four Academy Awards. One Oscar went to Jennifer Jones, marking her emergence as a Hollywood star. 

The Song of Bernadette is an upcoming musical adaption of Werfel's novel by Frank Wildhorn, Rinne Groff, and Robin Lerner. The new musical is scheduled to premiere at the Skylight Music Theatre in Milwaukee, Wisconsin on May 19, 2023. The first industry reading of the show took place on March 14-15, 2019. In September 2022, a workshop was held in Manhattan.

References

External links
 Bernadette of Lourdes Author John Martin's [who abridged Franz Werfel's classic The Song of Bernadette] website	
 The Song of Bernadette on the Google Books. 
 The Song of Bernadette on the Internet Archive.

1941 American novels
American novels adapted into films
Our Lady of Lourdes
Catholic novels
Fiction set in 1858
Novels set in the 1850s
Novels by Franz Werfel